Angie Tribeca is an American sitcom created by Steve Carell and Nancy Walls Carell. The series, a satire of police procedural shows, stars Rashida Jones as the titular police detective Angie Tribeca. It also stars Hayes MacArthur, Jere Burns, Deon Cole and Andrée Vermeulen in supporting roles. The series was announced by TBS in mid 2014 with a ten-episode order. Angie Tribeca premiered on a 25-hour 10-episode marathon on January 17–18, 2016. It was renewed for a fourth and final season, after which 40 episodes had aired.

Series overview

Episodes

Season 1 (2016)

Season 2 (2016)

Season 3 (2017)

Season 4 (2018)

References

Lists of American crime television series episodes
Lists of American mystery television series episodes
Lists of American sitcom episodes